Denis Vladimirovich Shcherbak (born 17 August 1989) is a Russian former professional footballer.

Club career
He made his professional debut in the Russian Second Division in 2006 for FC Krylia Sovetov-SOK Dimitrovgrad.

He played in the Russian Football National League for FC Irtysh Omsk in 2010.

International career
Shcherbak was one of the members of the Russian U-17 squad that won the 2006 UEFA U-17 Championship.

Personal
He is a son of Vladimir Shcherbak.

References

External links
 

1989 births
Sportspeople from Omsk
Living people
Russian footballers
Association football midfielders
Russia youth international footballers
FC Irtysh Omsk players
FC Lada-Tolyatti players
PFC Krylia Sovetov Samara players
Russian people of Ukrainian descent
FC Strogino Moscow players
FC Tolyatti players
FC Volga Ulyanovsk players